Papilio arnoldiana is a species of swallowtail butterfly from the genus Papilio that is found in south-western Ethiopia.

Taxonomy
Papilio arnoldiana is a member of the cynorta species group. The members of the clade are:

Papilio arnoldiana Vane-Wright, 1995
Papilio cynorta  Fabricius, 1793
Papilio plagiatus  Aurivillius, 1898

References

External links
External images

arnoldiana
Butterflies described in 1995